Walter Sarger  (by 1488 – 1535) of Wells, Somerset, was an English politician.

He was a Member (MP) of the Parliament of England for Wells in 1512, 1515 and 1523.

References

15th-century births
1535 deaths
People from Somerset
English MPs 1512–1514
English MPs 1515
English MPs 1523